Kim Song-hui is the name of:

Kim Song-hui (speed skater) (born 1965), North Korean speed skater
Kim Song-hui (table tennis) (born 1968), North Korean table tennis player
Kim Song-hui (footballer) (born 1987), North Korean association footballer

See also
Kim Sung-hee (born 1989), South Korean singer and former member of the girl band Kara (South Korean band)